Briaucourt is the name of the following communes in France:

 Briaucourt, Haute-Marne, in the Haute-Marne department
 Briaucourt, Haute-Saône, in the Haute-Saône department